Alex & Co: How to Grow Up Despite Your Parents is a 2016 Italian comedy film directed by Luca Lucini. It is based on Disney Channel's TV series Alex & Co.

Cast

References

External links

2016 films
Films directed by Luca Lucini
2010s Italian-language films
2016 comedy films
Italian comedy films
2010s Italian films